The Salmson 3 C.1 was a French World War I biplane fighter aircraft developed by Salmson which lost out in competition to the SPAD XIII and Morane-Saulnier AI.

Design
The Sal 3 C1 was a biplane of all-wood construction, originally built with a  Salmson 9Z, but re-engined with a  Salmson 9Zm in an effort to rectify deficiencies in performance.

Flight tests began in late 1917, but pilots complained of poor visibility and difficulties operating the machine. Although the Salmson 3 prototype was returned to the factory for modifications, further tests were unable remedy the deficiencies sufficiently, and the French military judged the Salmson 3 to be inferior to the SPAD XIII in performance.

Specifications (Sal 3 C1)

References

1910s French fighter aircraft
Biplanes
Salmson aircraft
Single-engined tractor aircraft
Aircraft first flown in 1917